Myerscough and Bilsborrow is a civil parish in the Wyre district of Lancashire, England.  It contains 15 listed buildings that are recorded in the National Heritage List for England.  All the listed buildings are designated at Grade II, the lowest of the three grades, which is applied to "buildings of national importance and special interest".  The parish contains the village of Bilsborrow, the hamlet of Myerscough, and the surrounding countryside.  The Lancaster Canal and the River Brock pass through the parish.  Five bridges over the canal and two over the river are listed, together with the aqueduct carrying the canal over the river.  The other listed buildings include farmhouses and a farm building, entrance piers and walls, a milestone, a boundary stone, and a country house.


Buildings

Notes and references

Notes

Citations

Sources

Lists of listed buildings in Lancashire
Buildings and structures in the Borough of Wyre